The 42nd Curtis Cup Match was played from June 10–12, 2022 at Merion Golf Club, Ardmore, Pennsylvania. It was played less than a year after the previous contest, at Conwy Golf Club in 2021, which had been delayed because of the COVID-19 pandemic. The USA team retained the Curtis Cup by a score of 15 to 4.

Format
The contest is a three-day competition, with three foursomes and three fourball matches on each of the first two days, and eight singles matches on the final day, a total of 20 points.

Each of the 20 matches is worth one point in the larger team competition. If a match ends all square after the 18th hole extra holes were not played. Rather, each side earned  point toward their team total. The team that accumulates at least 10 points won the competition. In the event of a tie, the current holder retains the Cup.

Teams
Eight players for USA and Great Britain & Ireland will participate in the event plus one non-playing captain for each team.

Sarah LeBrun Ingram and Elaine Ratcliffe were named captains of the US and "Great Britain and Ireland" teams. They had captained the teams at Conwy Golf Club in 2021.

Jensen Castle, the 2021 U.S. Women's Amateur champion, and Rose Zhang, the recipient of the 2021 Mark H. McCormack Medal, received automatic places in the US team. Rachel Heck and Rachel Kuehn also gained automatic selection based on the World Amateur Golf Ranking on April 6, 2022. The remaining four places were announced on April 15, 2022.

The Great Britain & Ireland team was announced on April 25, 2022. Hannah Darling and Caley McGinty were automatic selections as the top two in the World Amateur Golf Ranking on April 21, 2022.

Note: "Rank" is the World Amateur Golf Ranking as of the start of the Cup.

Friday's matches

Morning fourballs

Afternoon foursomes

Saturday's matches

Morning fourballs

Afternoon foursomes

Sunday's singles matches

References

External links
USGA site
The R&A site

Curtis Cup
Golf in Pennsylvania
Curtis Cup
Curtis Cup
Curtis Cup
Curtis Cup